Mohta is a village in Pathardi Taluka of Ahmednagar district.

Importance

Temple-town of Renuka Mata. Yatra is celebrated during Navratri.

Location

70 km east of Ahmednagar, 9 km from Pathardi in Maharashtra.
There are many buses of State Transport to reach at the God, from  Beed to Shirur Via Pathardi and Beed to Yelam Via Pathardi also from Aurangabad, Paithan Shevgaon to Pathardi Via Aashti there are many buses for an hour from Pathardi

A film called Jai Mohata Devi was made in 2008.

Nearest Airport :  Aurangabad Airport.

Nearest Railway Station  : Ahmednagar Railway Station.

Nearby cities: Beed, Ahmednagar

References
 http://shrimohatadevi.org/historyE.asp

Villages in Ahmednagar district